Dhanendra Kumar (born 1946) is a civil servant who was the first Chair of Competition Commission of India (CCI). Kumar formerly served as Executive Director at World Bank.

Biography 
Born in 1946, Kumar joined the Indian Administrative Service (IAS) in 1968.
Kumar has served as a Secretary to the following ministries:
 Ministry of Defence, 
 Ministry of Road Transport and Highways 
 Ministry of Culture

Kumar is the founder of the Chairman of Competition Advisory Services (India) LLP (COMPAD). During his career, the Ministry of Corporate Affairs (MCA) has constituted a Committee under his Chairmanship for framing of National Competition Policy (India) and related matters (formulate amendments in the Act).

The Ministry of Housing and Urban Poverty Alleviation (MHUPA) has constituted a Committee under his Chairmanship on Streamlining Approval Procedures for Real Estate Projects (SAPREP). Kumar is currently assisting Indian Institute of Corporate Affairs (of Ministry of Corporate Affairs, Government of India) as Principal Advisor and Chief Mentor of School of Competition Law – the upcoming National Centre of Excellence.

Awards 
Kumar was given the National Citizen's Award by Mother Teresa for outstanding contribution in development of Industrial Parks in Haryana. Kumar was also awarded honorary doctorate in recognition of outstanding contribution in public affairs.

Career

See also
 Competition Commission of India
 The Competition Act, 2002
 National Competition Policy (India)

References

Indian civil servants
Competition (economics)
Policies of India
1946 births
Living people
Place of birth missing (living people)
People from Saharanpur district